Time Will Tell may refer to:

 Time Will Tell (Fifth Angel album), 1989
 Time Will Tell (game show), an American game show which aired on the DuMont Television Network in 1954
 Time Will Tell (Hebe Tien album), 2020
"Time Will Tell" (Hikaru Utada song), a 1998 song by Hikaru Utada
 Time Will Tell (Millie album), 1970
 Time Will Tell (Paul Bley album), 1994
 Time Will Tell (Robert Cray album), 2003
 Time Will Tell (talk show), a Russian talk show that premiered in 2014
 "Time Will Tell", a 2001 episode of the television series Alias
 "Time Will Tell", a song by The Good Listeners, featured in the 2006 film The Devil Wears Prada
 "Time Will Tell", a 2011 song by Dave Hause from the album Resolutions